The Queen Victoria Statue was a sculpture of Queen Victoria that stood on the grounds of the Manitoba Legislative Building in Winnipeg, Manitoba, Canada.

It was designed by the British sculptor George Frampton, it cost $15,000, and was paid for by a mixture of public funds and private donations. Frampton used the same model of the seated queen in two other statues, the Statue of Queen Victoria, in St Helens, Merseyside, and the Memorial to Queen Victoria, in Leeds, West Yorkshire, both in England.  The statue was unveiled on 1 October 1904 by Sir Rodmond Roblin.  The statue depicts the queen seated on a throne with the sceptre in her right hand, and an orb in her left hand.

During the night of 23 June 2020, the statue was vandalized with red and white paint amid a wave of anti-racist protests. On 1 July 2021, on Canada Day, the statue was toppled and covered in paint during a protest denouncing the deaths of Indigenous children in Canadian residential schools. The head, crown, and the orb of the statue were removed by force by protesters overnight, though the head was later recovered from the Assiniboine River without its crown. The statue has been deemed unrepairable, and will not be replaced.

See also
 Royal monuments in Canada

References

External links

1904 sculptures
Buildings and structures completed in 1904
Buildings and structures in downtown Winnipeg
Destroyed sculptures
Royal monuments in Canada
Sculptures by George Frampton
Sculptures of women in Canada
Statues in Canada
Winnipeg
Statues removed in 2021
Vandalized works of art in Canada